René Mayer (4 May 189513 December 1972) was a French Radical politician of the Fourth Republic who served briefly as Prime Minister during 1953. 

Mayer was born and died in Paris. He led the Mayer Authority from 1955 to 1958. He was France's fourth Prime Minister of Jewish descent (after Léon Blum, Alexandre Millerand and Leon Bourgeois).

Mayer's Ministry, 8 January – 28 June 1953
René Mayer – President of the Council
Henri Queuille – Vice President of the Council
Georges Bidault – Minister of Foreign Affairs
René Pleven – Minister of National Defense and Armed Forces
Charles Brune – Minister of the Interior
Maurice Bourgès-Maunoury – Minister of Finance
Robert Buron – Minister of Economic Affairs
Jean Moreau – Minister of Budget
Jean-Marie Louvel – Minister of Industry and Energy
Paul Bacon – Minister of Labour and Social Security
Léon Martinaud-Déplat – Minister of Justice
André Marie – Minister of National Education
Henry Bergasse – Minister of Veterans and War Victims
Camille Laurens – Minister of Agriculture
Louis Jacquinot – Minister of Overseas France
André Morice – Minister of Public Works, Transport, and Tourism
Paul Ribeyre – Minister of Public Health and Population
Pierre Courant – Minister of Reconstruction and Town Planning
Roger Duchet – Minister of Posts
Paul Ribeyre – Minister of Commerce
Jean Letourneau – Minister of Relations with Partner States
Édouard Bonnefous – Minister of State
Paul Coste-Floret – Minister of State

Changes
11 February 1953 – Guy Petit succeeds Ribeyre as Minister of Commerce.

References

External links
 

1895 births
1972 deaths
Politicians from Paris
Jewish French politicians
Radical Party (France) politicians
Prime Ministers of France
French Ministers of Justice
French Ministers of Finance
Transport ministers of France
French Ministers of Merchant Marine
Members of the Constituent Assembly of France (1946)
Deputies of the 1st National Assembly of the French Fourth Republic
Deputies of the 2nd National Assembly of the French Fourth Republic
French European Commissioners
Jewish prime ministers
N M Rothschild & Sons people
French military personnel of World War I
Burials at Montparnasse Cemetery
Members of the High Authority of the European Coal and Steel Community